Zealandia is a town in the Canadian province of Saskatchewan. It is one of the smallest communities in the province to be designated as a town.

Demographics 

Notable people

Aldon Wilkie (1914 - 1992), Major League Pitcher for the Pittsburgh Pirates

See also 

 List of communities in Saskatchewan
 List of towns in Saskatchewan

References

St. Andrews No. 287, Saskatchewan
Towns in Saskatchewan
Division No. 12, Saskatchewan